The Servants of Charity is a Catholic clerical religious congregation of Pontifical Right for men. Members of this clerical congregation are popularly known  as 'Guanelliani' (or Guanellians, in English). They add the nominal letters  SC after their names to indicate their membership in the Congeagation.

History 
The institute was founded in Como on March 24, 1908 by Italian priest Luigi Guanella, (1842 - 1915), a friend of David Albertario and Giuseppe Toniolo. He was sensitive to issues of social outcasts and the handicapped. This gave birth to a religious community to provide the needs of the poor. Their motto reads "In Omnibus Charitas" (In all things Love).

The congregation obtained the recognition of ecclesiastical institution of pontifical right with decree of praise, 1912 and was again approved in 1928. 

There is also the female branch of Daughters of Saint Mary of Providence.

Activities and dissemination 
These religious operate day and evening schools for workers, institutes for the education of youth and speakers. They also run facilities worldwide for the care of persons with intellectual and developmental disabilities.

As of December 31, 2018, the congregation had 103 houses and 558 religious, 366 of them priests.

Notes

Related Items 
 Saint Luigi Guanella 
 Venerable Aurelio Bacciarini 
 Blessed Clare Bosatta

External links 
 Opera Don Guanella - Congregation of the Servants of Charity 
 Servants of Charity - Divine Providence Province

Como
Catholic orders and societies